Besheer El-Tabei Abdulhamid (born 24 February 1976) is a retired Egyptian footballer. He was a powerful center back and one of the best defenders in Egypt in his early days, he is best known for playing for Zamalek SC football club where he participated in his former's club achievements in that time. He ended his career at the Egyptian side El Gaish. El Tabei was well known with his powerful free kick shots and his powerful body.

Titles as a player
14 For Zamalek

3 Egyptian League (2000–01, 2002–03, 2003–04)
2 Egyptian Super Cup (2000–01, 2001–02)
3 Egypt Cup (1999–2000, 2001–02, 2007–08)
1 African Cup Winners' Cup (2000)
1 African Champions League (2002)
1 African Super Cup (2003)
1 Afro-Asian Cup (1997)
1 Arab Club Championship (2003)
1 Saudi-Egyptian Super Cup (2003)

Personal
Best Player in Arab Club Championship 2003
Best Defender in Egypt (2002)

References

External links

1976 births
Living people
People from Damietta
Zamalek SC players
Çaykur Rizespor footballers
Smouha SC players
Egyptian footballers
Egypt international footballers
Egyptian expatriate footballers
Süper Lig players
Expatriate footballers in Turkey
2004 African Cup of Nations players
Egyptian Premier League players
Association football defenders